America's Worst Driver is an American reality television program on Travel Channel, based on the television series Britain's Worst Driver and Canada's Worst Driver, part of the Worst Driver television franchise. Hosted by Alonzo Bodden and Jill Simonian, contestants from eight different cities compete to not be named the worst driver in their respective cities, because the contestants who are named the worst driver in their city has their car destroyed, while everyone else wins prizes ranging from free oil changes to a trip for two to Florida. All contestants are enrolled in a Driver's Education class in their respective cities regardless of what happens in the series. In the two-part finale, the eight worst drivers meet up in Los Angeles to show who is the most improved, with each driver winning a new car, while the driver who hasn't improved is named America's Worst Driver. Matt Conn of San Francisco was named as such and had a car representing him torn apart by Robosaurus.

Synopsis

 (OUT) The contestant won a new car and is out of the running for America's Worst Driver.
 (AWD) The contestant became America's Worst Driver and had a car representing them destroyed.

Episodes

References

2010s American reality television series
2010 American television series debuts
2010 American television series endings
Travel Channel original programming
Driver's education
Automotive television series
American television series based on British television series
Worst Driver (franchise)